Khan Kradai railway station is a railway station located in Ao Noi Subdistrict, Prachuap Khiri Khan City, Prachuap Khiri Khan.

Train services 
 Ordinary 251/252 Bang Sue Junction-Prachuap Khiri Khan-Bang Sue Junction
 Ordinary 254/255 Lang Suan-Thon Buri-Lang Suan

References 
 
 

Railway stations in Thailand